Namwambina is a genus of tephritid  or fruit flies in the family Tephritidae.

Species
Namwambina festinata Munro, 1957

References

Tephritinae
Tephritidae genera
Diptera of Africa